Ramesh Dube (born 16 October 1942) is an Indian politician with the Bahujan Samaj Party (BSP). He stood for the 2007 by-elections on the BSP ticket and was a Member of Parliament from Mirzapur.

He is  a former Member of the Legislative Assembly during 1985-1995 from Indian National Congress and state minister from Andheri

Earlier he was member of Mumbai Municipal Corporation during 1968–1984. He was also founder member of Nationalist Congress Party

References

Living people
1942 births
Marathi politicians
Maharashtra MLAs 1990–1995
Bahujan Samaj Party politicians from Uttar Pradesh
Maharashtra MLAs 1985–1990
India MPs 2004–2009
People from Bhadohi district
People from Mirzapur
Indian National Congress politicians from Uttar Pradesh